Elections in the state of Bihar, India are conducted in accordance with the Constitution of India. The Assembly of Bihar creates laws regarding the conduct of local body elections unilaterally while any changes by the state legislature to the conduct of state level elections need to be approved by the Parliament of India.

Elections to the Lok Sabha, also termed as General Elections, are typically held every 5 years after the central government has completed its term. It may also be held before the completion of term if parliament is dissolved early. Similarly, elections to Vidhan Sabha are conducted every five years. Last Lok Sabha election was held in 2019 and Vidhan Sabha election was held in 2015. Elections to the Rajya Sabha are held at regular interval with one third of the members retiring in a staggered manner. Members of Vidhan Sabha elect the state's representative to Rajya Sabha.

Bihar electoral system
The elections to the Lok Sabha and Vidhan Sabha are conducted along similar lines with the major difference being size of constituencies. At present each Lok Sabha constituency consists of 6 Vidhan Sabha constituency. Each constituency elects a single member to represent them via a First Past the Post System, where a candidate with plurality of total votes cast is elected.

Currently the major parties in the state are Bharatiya Janata Party, Indian National Congress, Janata Dal (United), Rashtriya Janata Dal and Lok Janshakti Party(Ram Vilas) and Rashtriya Lok Janshakti Party. The state was dominated by Indian National Congress until the decade of 1970s with parties like BJP and Janata Dal gaining prominence. For the purpose of elections every party is assigned a symbol to help voters in recognizing the candidate they support.

National level representation

Lok Sabha delegation

Currently, the state of Bihar sends 40 representatives to the Lok Sabha, elected through a first past the post system. The Indian general election, 2009 in Bihar were held for 40 seats with the state going to polls in the first four phases of the general elections. The major contenders in the state were the National Democratic Alliance (NDA), Indian National Congress and the Fourth Front. NDA consisted of the Bharatiya Janata Party (BJP) and Janata Dal (United) whereas the fourth front was constituted of the Rashtriya Janata Dal (RJD), Lok Jan Shakti Party (LJP) and the Samajwadi Party (SP).

Rajya Sabha delegation
Both the houses of the state legislature jointly nominate Members of Parliament to the Rajya Sabha. The Rajya Sabha or Council of States is the upper house of the Parliament of India. Membership of Rajya Sabha is limited by the Constitution to a maximum of 250 members, and current laws have provision for 245 members. Most of the members of the House are indirectly elected by state and territorial legislatures using single transferable votes, while the President of India can appoint 12 members for their contributions to art, literature, science, and social services. Members sit for staggered six-year terms, with one third of the members retiring every two years.

State level representation

Legislative assembly

Bihar legislature assembly has 243 seats. For the election of its members, the state is divided into 243 Assembly Constituencies in which the candidate securing the largest number of votes is declared elected. In the Bihar Assembly Elections, 2010, the National Democratic Alliance formed the state government having secured a simple majority of 206 seats.
Bihar Legislative Assembly came into existence in 1937. The Assembly had a strength of 152 members. According to the provisions of the Constitution of India, the first General Elections in the state were held in 1952. The total strength of membership in the Assembly was 331, including one nominated member. Dr Sri Krishna Singh became the first Leader of the house and the Chief Minister and Dr Anurag Narayan Sinha was elected the first deputy leader of the assembly and became state's first Deputy Chief Minister. It was reduced to 318 during the second General Elections. In 1977, the total number of elected members of the Bihar Legislative Assembly was further raised from 318 to 324. With the creation of a separate State of Jharkhand, by an Act of Parliament titled the Bihar Reorganisation Act, 2000, the strength of the Bihar Legislative Assembly was reduced from 325 to 243 members. The current Nitish Kumar government is a minority, powered by the BJP and LJP to majority status

Legislative Council

The upper house known as the Legislative Council has lesser powers than the Assembly and several of its members are nominated by the Assembly. Others are elected from various sections of the society like Graduates and Teachers. Currently the Legislative Council consists of 95 members.
A new Province of Bihar and Orissa was created by the British Government on 12 December 1911. The Legislative Council with a total of 43 members belonging to different categories was formed in 1912. The first sitting of the council was convened on 20 January 1913. In 1936, Bihar attained its separate Statehood. Under the Government of India Act, 1919, the unicameral legislature got converted into bicameral one, i.e. the Bihar Legislative Council and the Bihar Legislative Assembly. Under the Government of India Act, 1935, the Bihar Legislative Council consisted of 29 members. After the first General Elections 1952, the number of members was increased up to 72 and by 1958 the number was raised to 96. With the creation of Jharkhand, as a result of the Bihar Reorganisation Act, 2000 passed by the Parliament, the strength of the Bihar Legislative Council has been reduced from 96 to 75 members

History of elections in Bihar

Assembly election

Lok Sabha Elections

1951: Main winner: Congress
1957: Main winner: Congress
1962: Main winner: Indian National Congress: 39 out of 53, Swatantra Party: 7
1967: Main winner: Congress
1971: Main winner: Congress
1977: Total: 54. Janata Party + Alliance: All 54. Congress: Zero.
1980: Total: 54. Congress the main winner with 39. CPI: 5
1984:   Congress: 48/54.

Till 2000
Total Seats- 54

After 2000
Total Seats- 40

History of politics

Electoral process

Pre elections
The Election Commission's Model Code of Conduct enters into force as soon as the notification for polls is issued. This places restrictions on the campaigning by political parties as well as prohibits certain government actions that would unduly influence the election.

Voting day
The electoral process is the same as in the rest of India with Electronic Voting Machines being used for all Lok Sabha and State Assembly elections.

Post elections
After the election day, the EVMs are stood stored in a strong room under heavy security. After the different phases of the elections are complete, a day is set to count the votes. The votes are tallied and typically, the verdict is known within hours. The candidate who has mustered the most votes is declared the winner of the constituency.

The party or coalition that has won the most seats is invited by the Governor to form the new government. The coalition or party must prove its majority in the floor of the house (Legislative Assembly) in a vote of confidence by obtaining a simple majority (minimum 50%) of the votes in the House.

Voter registration
For few cities in Bihar, the voter registration forms can be generated online and submitted to the nearest electoral office.

Absentee voting
As of now, India does not have an absentee ballot system. Section 19 of The Representation of the People Act (RPA)-1950 allows a person to register to vote if he or she is above 18 years of age and is an ‘ordinary resident’ of the residing constituency i.e. living at the current address for 6 months or longer. Section 20 of the above Act disqualifies a non-resident Indian (NRI) from getting his/her name registered in the electoral rolls. Consequently, it also prevents an NRI from casting his/her vote in elections to the Parliament and to the State Legislatures.

The Representation of the People (Amendment) 2006 Bill was introduced in the Parliament by Shri Hanraj Bharadwaj, Minister of Law and Justice during February 2006 with an objective to amend Section 20 of the RPA-1950 to enable NRIs to vote. Despite the report submitted by the Parliamentary Standing Committee two years ago, the Government has so far failed to act on the recommendations. The Bill was reintroduced in the 2008 budget session of the Parliament to the Lok Sabha. But no action taken once again.

Several civic society organizations have urged the government to amend the RPA act to allow NRI's and people on the move to cast their vote through absentee ballot system.

Further reading
 Subrata K. Mitra and V.B. Singh.  1999.  Democracy and Social Change in India: A Cross-Sectional Analysis of the National Electorate.  New Delhi: Sage Publications.   (India HB)  (U.S. HB).
 Subrata K. Mitra, Mike Enskat, Clemens Spiess (eds.). 2004. Political Parties in South Asia. Greenwood: Praeger.
 Subrata K. Mitra/Mike Enskat/V.B. Singh. 2001. India, in: Nohlen, Dieter (Ed.). Elections in Asia and the Pacific: A Data Handbook. Vol. I. Oxford: Oxford University Press

See also

List of Assembly constituencies of Bihar
List of Lok Sabha Constituencies in Bihar
Elections in India
49-O Popularly known as 'No Vote'
2015 Bihar Legislative Assembly election

References

External links
Election Commission of India
Elections in India History and Information
News Related to 2009 Elections in India
Social Media Conversations of Indian Elections 2009